is a Japanese female rock vocalist. She is arguably best known for her work as the vocalist and lyrics writer for SEKIRIA, the band that did the music for the anime series Bubblegum Crisis: Tokyo 2040 and played live in the movie Shuto Kōsoku Max.

References

External links
Akira Sudou official fan site 
 
Video of 'Face of Love' MP3 gallery of Eric Martin, duet with Sudou Akira

1971 births
Living people
Japanese women rock singers
Musicians from Gunma Prefecture
21st-century Japanese singers
21st-century Japanese women singers